Sankt Stefan may refer to:

Localities
Austria
Sankt Stefan am Walde, Upper Austria
Sankt Stefan im Gailtal, Carinthia
Sankt Stefan im Rosental, Styria
Sankt Stefan ob Leoben, Styria
Sankt Stefan ob Stainz, Styria
Switzerland
St. Stephan, Switzerland, Canton of Bern, Switzerland

Churches
St. Štefan Kráľ's Church, Žilina, Slovakia
St. Stefan's Romanian Orthodox Church, South St. Paul, Minnesota, US

See also
 St. Stephen (disambiguation)
 St. Stephens (disambiguation)
 St. Stephen's Cathedral (disambiguation)
 St. Stephen's Church (disambiguation)
 San Esteban (disambiguation)
 Saint Etienne (disambiguation)